Glicaramide (SQ-65993) is an orally bioavailable anti-diabetic medication. It has a similar potency as glibenclamide (glyburide) in the class of medication known as sulfonylureas. Its structure is similar since it has a cyclic acyl group which replaces the latter's 2-methoxy-5-chlorobenzyl. Same as glibenclamide, it is classified as a second-generation sulfonylurea. It may have more pronounced extra-pancreatic effects than glibenclamide or tolbutamide.

See also 
 Glibenclamide

References 

Potassium channel blockers
Diuretics
1-(Benzenesulfonyl)-3-cyclohexylureas
Carboxamides
Phenol ethers
Pyrazolopyridines